West Line is a village in Cass County, Missouri. The population was 97 at the 2010 census. It is part of the Kansas City metropolitan area.

History
West Line was originally called State Line, and under the latter name was platted in 1870. The village was named from its position near the west boundary of the county and state. A post office called State Line was established in 1871, the name was changed to West Line in 1875, and the post office closed in 1973.

Geography
West Line is located at  (38.631902, -94.584567).

Demographics

2010 census
As of the census of 2010, there were 97 people, 37 households, and 28 families living in the village. The racial makeup of the village was 99.0% White and 1.0% from two or more races. Hispanic or Latino of any race were 2.1% of the population.

There were 37 households, of which 43.2% had children under the age of 18 living with them, 54.1% were married couples living together, 10.8% had a female householder with no husband present, 10.8% had a male householder with no wife present, and 24.3% were non-families. 18.9% of all households were made up of individuals, and 8.1% had someone living alone who was 65 years of age or older. The average household size was 2.62 and the average family size was 3.00.

The median age in the village was 43.3 years. 26.8% of residents were under the age of 18; 5.2% were between the ages of 18 and 24; 20.7% were from 25 to 44; 38.1% were from 45 to 64; and 9.3% were 65 years of age or older. The gender makeup of the village was 51.5% male and 48.5% female.

2000 census
As of the census of 2000, there were 95 people, 35 households, and 28 families living in the village. The population density was 768.0 people per square mile (305.7/km). There were 37 housing units at an average density of 299.1 per square mile (119.0/km). The racial makeup of the village was 100.00% White.

There were 35 households, out of which 20.0% had children under the age of 18 living with them, 60.0% were married couples living together, 8.6% had a female householder with no husband present, and 20.0% were non-families. 20.0% of all households were made up of individuals, and 8.6% had someone living alone who was 65 years of age or older. The average household size was 2.71 and the average family size was 3.00.

In the village, the population was spread out, with 22.1% under the age of 18, 9.5% from 18 to 24, 33.7% from 25 to 44, 18.9% from 45 to 64, and 15.8% who were 65 years of age or older. The median age was 34 years. For every 100 females, there were 115.9 males. For every 100 females age 18 and over, there were 117.6 males.

The median income for a household in the village was $46,250, and the median income for a family was $50,833. Males had a median income of $33,750 versus $20,625 for females. The per capita income for the village was $24,831. There were no families and 6.3% of the population living below the poverty line, including no under eighteens and none of those over 64.

References

Villages in Cass County, Missouri
Villages in Missouri